Sir Charles Russell, 1st Baronet,  (8 July 1863 – 27 March 1928) was an English solicitor.

Biography
Russell was the son of Charles Russell, Baron Russell of Killowen.

In 1891 he started the firm that became Charles Russell LLP.

Russell was created a Baronet on 18 January 1916, appointed a Knight Commander of the Royal Victorian Order (KCVO) in the 1921 New Year Honours and appointed a Knight of Grace of the Order of St John of Jerusalem (KStJ) in March 1921.

He was succeeded in the baronetcy by his nephew under the terms of the special remainder.

Notes

1863 births
1928 deaths
English solicitors
Knights Commander of the Royal Victorian Order
Sons of life peers
Baronets in the Baronetage of the United Kingdom
Members of London County Council